Torkild Sören Strandberg (born 29 June 1970), is a Swedish politician representing the Liberal Party. He is chairman of the municipal council in the city of Landskrona since 2007, and a former member of the Swedish Parliament (from September 2002 until September 2018).

References

1970 births
21st-century Swedish politicians
Living people
Members of the Riksdag 2002–2006
Members of the Riksdag 2006–2010
Members of the Riksdag 2010–2014
Members of the Riksdag 2014–2018
Members of the Riksdag 2018–2022
Members of the Riksdag from the Liberals (Sweden)
Place of birth missing (living people)